Monday James (born 19 October 1986) is a Nigerian professional football defender.

Club career
James began his career with Bendel Insurance before being transferred to Bayelsa United in January 2006.

He went on a five-month loan to Swedish club Hammarby IF in November 2008 after a couple of games with the club, where there is a clause in the loan that gives Hammarby the option to buy him when the loan ends. On 7 June 2009 Hammarby IF reported that they would buy James and he would be given a four-year contract.

As of June 2010, James has been out of play for almost a year, due to a misunderstanding with the club doctors claiming he has a heart condition while he was 100 percent healthy, he did not sustain any injury that prevented him from playing.

29 June 2011, James extended his contract with Hammarby IF for another two years, playing 17 games in 2011, 6 games in 2012 and played 15 games in 2013.

International career
He represented his country at the 2008 Beijing Olympics, was part of the Nigerian team during the 2005 FIFA World Youth Championship.

Honours
National team:

U-23:
 Olympic Games
 Silver medalist : 2008
 Intercontinental cup Malaysia 2008 (gold medalist)

U-20:
 FIFA U-20 World Cup (silver medalist)
FIFA World Youth Championship 2005 (gold medalist)

External links

 Player Profile

References

1986 births
Living people
Sportspeople from Lagos
Association football central defenders
Nigerian footballers
Nigeria under-20 international footballers
Nigeria international footballers
Bayelsa United F.C. players
Footballers at the 2008 Summer Olympics
Olympic footballers of Nigeria
Olympic silver medalists for Nigeria
Yoruba sportspeople
Allsvenskan players
Hammarby Fotboll players
Bendel Insurance F.C. players
Olympic medalists in football
Nigerian expatriate footballers
Expatriate footballers in Sweden
Medalists at the 2008 Summer Olympics